The 2009 Open Diputación Ciudad de Pozoblanco was a professional tennis tournament played on hard court. This was the tenth edition of the tournament which was part of the Tretorn SERIE+ of the 2009 ATP Challenger Tour. It took place in Pozoblanco, Spain between 6 and 12 July 2009.

Singles entrants

Seeds

 Rankings are as of June 29, 2009.

Other entrants
The following players received wildcards into the singles main draw:
  Steven Diez
  Juan José Leal-Gómez
  Adrián Menéndez-Maceiras
  Lamine Ouahab

The following players received entry from the qualifying draw:
  Ilya Belyaev
  Jean-Noel Insausti
  Brydan Klein
  Ludovic Walter

Champions

Singles

 Karol Beck def.  Thiago Alves, 6–4, 6–3

Doubles

 Karol Beck /  Jaroslav Levinský def.  Colin Fleming /  Ken Skupski, 6–2, 6–7, [10–7]

References
Official website
ITF Search